The Erie SeaWolves are an American professional baseball team based in Erie, Pennsylvania. They compete in Minor League Baseball (MiLB) as a member of the Eastern League's Southwest Division, serving as the Double-A affiliate of the Detroit Tigers. The SeaWolves currently play their home games at UPMC Park in downtown Erie, a part of the Louis J. Tullio Plaza along with Erie Insurance Arena and the Warner Theatre.

The "SeaWolves" name refers to the city's location along Lake Erie as well as their original affiliation with the Pittsburgh Pirates. "Sea wolf" is a historical epithet for sailors who engaged in piracy. Coincidentally, the "Pirates" moniker originated with the Pittsburgh Alleghenys' pursuit of second-baseman and Erie native, Lou Bierbauer, in 1891. Bierbauer started his career with the Philadelphia Athletics of the American Association, later joining the Brooklyn Ward's Wonders of the newfound Players' League for the 1890 season. When the Players' League folded in 1891, most of the members went back to their former National League or American Association clubs. However, Bierbauer never signed a contract to return to the Athletics, and the Alleghenys were determined to sign him before other teams noticed. Ned Hanlon, manager of the Alleghenys, braved the icy conditions of Erie's Presque Isle peninsula during a snowstorm to commit Bierbauer. When the Athletics learned about this secret deal, they objected to Bierbauer's signing and demanded his return to their club. An official with the American Association also objected to Bierbauer's contract with the Alleghenys, calling their actions "piratical." Yet, the  league ruled in favor of the Alleghenys, and they acquired Bierbauer as a free agent. Soon afterward, both players and their fans referred to the team as the "Pittsburgh Pirates." In 1891, the club officially rebranded as the "Pirates," making light of their critics.

History
On June 20, 1995, the Erie SeaWolves defeated the Jamestown Jammers in their inaugural game in Erie. José Guillén, a Major League Baseball alumnus from the Dominican Republic, hit the decisive home-run for the team. The SeaWolves club started in 1989 as the Welland Pirates, based in Welland, Ontario as a member of the short-season New York–Penn League. The team played at Welland Stadium from 1989 to 1994 and were affiliated with the Pittsburgh Pirates. When the Welland Pirates relocated to Erie in 1995, they were rebranded as the "Erie SeaWolves." The relocation of the team from Welland to Erie forced the Frontier League incarnation of the Erie Sailors to relocate to Johnstown, Pennsylvania where they became the Johnstown Steal (this team is now known as the Florence Y'alls, based in Florence, Kentucky). Before that, there was another team called the Erie Sailors which played in the New York - Penn League. However, they relocated to Wappingers Falls, New York (becoming the Hudson Valley Renegades) because the team's owner Marvin Goldklang did not upgrade Ainsworth Field to Major League Baseball specifications. Once the civic government secured an $8 million grant from the Commonwealth of Pennsylvania to build UPMC Park (then known as Jerry Uht Park) the Welland Pirates moved to Erie. While Erie lacked affiliated baseball in 1994, the city fielded an independent baseball franchise in the Frontier League and reused the "Sailors" name. The SeaWolves succeed various Erie-based baseball franchises, namely every version of the Erie Sailors (the New York–Penn League franchise is now called the State College Spikes).

The SeaWolves served as a Pittsburgh Pirates affiliate from 1995 to 1998. In 1999, the Double-A Eastern League added two expansion franchises, with Erie gaining one of them. The team joined the Eastern League after it moved up from the Short-Season A level to the Double-A level. Therefore, the current SeaWolves organization is considered a continuation of the former one even though it changed classes. Minor League Baseball allowed Erie to keep their New York–Penn League records and history as a member of the Eastern League. Subsequently, the Mahoning Valley Scrappers replaced them in the New York-Penn League, which is officially considered an expansion franchise rather than a continuation of the SeaWolves.

The SeaWolves became an affiliate of the Anaheim Angels after moving to the Double-A level. The team switched to the Detroit Tigers in 2001, with whom they continue to be affiliated.

In conjunction with Major League Baseball's restructuring of Minor League Baseball in 2021, the SeaWolves were organized into the Double-A Northeast. In 2022, the Double-A Northeast became known as the Eastern League, the name historically used by the regional circuit prior to the 2021 reorganization.

Ownership
Palisades Baseball originally owned the Erie SeaWolves when they started play in 1995.  In 2003, Palisades sold the team to Mandalay Sports Entertainment, a former owner/operator of several Minor League Baseball clubs. On March 27, 2015, Fernando Aguirre was introduced as the owner of the SeaWolves. Aguirre, a veteran executive of Procter & Gamble (P&G) and Chiquita Brands International, purchased the team from Mandalay for an undisclosed amount and announced his intent to keep the team in Erie. Aguirre also owns a minority share of the Cincinnati Reds of Major League Baseball, and a one-third share of the Myrtle Beach Pelicans, the Single-A affiliate of the Chicago Cubs in the Carolina League.

Logos and uniforms
The main colors for the Erie SeaWolves are black, red, and white, with minor accents of gold and gray. The primary logo includes a stylized "pirate wolf" centered over two intersecting baseball bats complete with sword hilts. The wordmark arches in line with the wolf's tricorne in white, black, and gold. The SeaWolves also have a secondary logo featuring a weathered Jolly Roger on a "bat sword," charged with a red letter "E." This emblem alludes to Erie's nickname, "Flagship City," a reference to the Flagship Niagara that Commodore Oliver Hazard Perry commanded during his 1813 victory over the British Royal Navy in the Battle of Lake Erie.

The home uniforms include a black cap charged with the "bandanna wolf" logo and white jerseys featuring black piping. The "SeaWolves" wordmark arches across the front in black letters with red outline, and the crossed "bat swords" logo on the left sleeve. The away uniforms feature a gray jersey with black piping, the "Erie" wordmark in red with black outline, and the crossed "bat sword" logo on the left sleeve. The alternate jersey is red with black piping and includes the "Erie" wordmark in white with black outline; the "tricorne wolf" logo occupies the left sleeve. For the 2014 season, the SeaWolves added a black, white, and red panel cap with a black alternate jersey to match. Both include the "pirate wolf" logo. In 2016, the team debuted another alternate cap featuring a black crown with a red bill, charged with the "bandanna wolf" logo.

Culture

Mascots

The Erie SeaWolves' official mascot is an anthropomorphic, gray canidae named C. Wolf. He wears the team's official red alternate jersey with a pirate hat, a red and white bandana, and an eye patch.  His friends include Paws (the Detroit Tigers' official mascot) as well as three anthropomorphic sausages sponsored by the Erie-based Smith's Provision Company: Kenny Kiełbasa, Herbie Hot Dog, and Santino the Italian Sausage.

Promotions

Buck Night
"Buck Night" is a highly celebrated promotion by the Erie SeaWolves at UPMC Park. It is held several times each season, allowing fans who have paid for reserved seats to purchase specified food items for only $1.00 each. The menu includes hot dogs, popcorn, soft drinks, and American-made beer.

Alternative Facts Night
On March 10, 2017, the Erie SeaWolves made national headlines for their upcoming "Alternative Facts Night" promotion, held on Friday, August 25, 2017. Their opponent was the Akron RubberDucks, whose alternative name was the "Akron Yellow Bath Toys" for the game. The promotion is a reference to a popular culture trend following a news story in which Kellyanne Conway, Counselor to U.S. president, Donald Trump, coined the phrase "alternative facts" to bolster a disputed claim by White House Press Secretary, Sean Spicer, that more people attended Trump's presidential inauguration on January 20, 2017 than the first inauguration of Barack Obama on January 20, 2009. The SeaWolves will host Alternative Facts Night to "celebrate facts that the team knows to be true — even if some media outlets may dispute them." As part of the promotion, the first 1,000 fans will receive a 2016 SeaWolves Eastern League Championship ring, although the title was actually earned by the RubberDucks. The club also expects to have 1.2 million fans attend the game between Erie and Akron, even though UPMC Park only has a seating capacity of 6,000. The actual proceeds for Alternative Facts Night will go to the cash-strapped Erie City School District.

In anticipation of "Alternative Facts Night," Fernando Aguirre published a message on Twitter that read, "This is huge! #AlternativeFactsNight. We will build a [right field] wall and Akron will pay for it. I promise." This was a parody of Donald Trump's political campaign, in which he stated, "I would build a great wall, and nobody builds walls better than me, believe me, and I'll build them very inexpensively — I will build a great, great wall on our southern border. And I will have Mexico pay for that wall. Mark my words."

Community service
The Erie SeaWolves engage in many philanthropic efforts throughout Erie and its surrounding communities.  Key team initiatives include UPMC Health Plan Paint the Park Pink Weekend to benefit local cancer charities, Northwest Savings Bank Gloves for Kids equipment drive, and Sensory friendly Day at the Ballpark in partnership with the Autism Society of Northwest Pennsylvania.  The team also sponsors youth sports and education programs through the SeaWolves Community Fund.  On September 16, 2015, the Erie SeaWolves earned the Erie Times-News Commitment to Erie Award for community service by a business with 50 or fewer employees.

Broadcasting
In February 2017, the Erie SeaWolves extended their broadcasting contract with Fox Sports Radio AM 1330: The Fan, a local affiliate of Connoisseur Media, to air every game during the 2017 and 2018 seasons. Greg Gania has served as the Voice of the SeaWolves since 2006 and is the longest tenured play-by-play broadcaster in team history.

Season-by-season results

Season results in New York–Penn League

Regular season

Season results in Eastern League

Regular season

Playoffs

Roster

Notable alumni

 A. J. Achter
 Alex Avila
 José Azocar
 Sandy Báez
 Matt Beech
 Randor Bierd
 Beau Burrows
 Ramón Cabrera
 Anthony Castro
 Brent Clevlen
 Román Colón
 Brian Cooper
 Nate Cornejo
 Deivi Cruz
 Lance Davis
 Casey Fien
 Michael Fulmer
 Devon Travis
 Justin Verlander

Retired numbers

References

External links

 

 
Baseball teams established in 1995
Professional baseball teams in Pennsylvania
Anaheim Angels minor league affiliates
Detroit Tigers minor league affiliates
Pittsburgh Pirates minor league affiliates
1995 establishments in Pennsylvania
Eastern League (1938–present) teams
Double-A Northeast teams